Brenda Daniela Uribe Soriano (born December 11, 1993 in Lima, Peru) is a Peruvian volleyball player who plays for the Peru national team.

Career

2009
Brenda debuted in Deportivo Alianza Club in Lima, Peru.

2010
She debuted internationally with her U20 National Volleyball Team at the 2010 South America Volleyball Championship U20 winning the Silver Medal. Her team also won the Bronze Medal at the 2010 Youth Olympic Games.

2011
Brenda played with her National Junior Team at the U-20 Pan-American Cup, held in her country, Peru. Her team won the Gold Medal and Brenda was named MVP of the tournament, she also won the "Best Spiker" award.

She also participated with her team in the 2011 Women's Junior World Championship which has held in Peru, her team finished in 6th place.

Right after the Junior World Championship, Brenda joined Peru's senior team for the 2011 World Grand Prix, she made her debut with the senor team in Peru's first match, against Thailand

Brenda signed with Alianza Lima Club after returning from the 2011 World Grand Prix. She captain of the U20 squad and won the Silver Medal with her team at Peru's first Junior National Volleyball Championship.

Clubs
  Deportivo Alianza (2009–2011)
  Alianza Lima (2011–2012)
  CV Universidad San Martin de Porres (2012-2014)
  Jaamsa (2015–2016)
  Alianza Lima (2016–still)

Awards

Individuals
 2010 Junior South American Championship "Best Spiker"
 2011 Junior Pan-American Cup "Most Valuable Player"
 2011 Junior Pan-American Cup "Best Spiker"
 2011-12 Liga Nacional Superior de Voleibol "Best Scorer"

National Team

Junior Team
 2010 Junior South American Championship –  Silver Medal
 2010 Youth Olympic Games –  Bronze Medal
 2011 Junior Pan-American Cup –  Gold Medal

Clubs
 2011 Junior Volleyball National Championship –  Runner-up with Alianza Lima

References

External links
 FIVB Profile

1993 births
Living people
Volleyball players at the 2010 Summer Youth Olympics
Volleyball players at the 2015 Pan American Games
Pan American Games competitors for Peru
Peruvian women's volleyball players
21st-century Peruvian women